The Broken West was an American power pop band, formed in Los Angeles, California in 2004, and later signed to Merge Records. The members are Ross Flournoy (guitar, vocals), Dan Iead (guitar, backing vocals), Brian Whelan (bass, backing vocals), Rob McCorkindale (drums, percussion), and Scott Claassen (keys, backing vocals). Drummer Rob McCorkindale was later replaced by Sean McDonald. Jeff Howell (Dan Iead's high school friend from Connecticut) joined the Broken West as their touring keyboardist, playing synth, organ and piano.

History

Initially called "The Brokedown," the group changed their name in 2006 because of legal concerns with a Chicago band with a similar name. Their debut full-length release is I Can't Go On, I'll Go On, referencing a Samuel Beckett quote.

Their single "Down in the Valley" was featured in an episode of Grey's Anatomy.

They have played the Austin City Limits Music Festival, and toured the U.S. and Canada with Fountains of Wayne and with The National.

None of the band members are originally from Los Angeles. Frontman Ross Flournoy was born in Memphis, Tennessee and moved with his family to Santa Barbara, California when he was 11 years old. His musical pleasures growing up included Big Star, Teenage Fanclub, and The Beatles. Dan Iead and Jeff Howell grew up in Branford, CT. Brian Whelan split time between Seattle and Northern California.

The band's second album Now or Heaven was released in 2008 through Merge Records.

The band has broken up and Ross Flournoy released his first record as Apex Manor on January 25, 2011, also on Merge Records. The band's song "Perfect Games", and other songs, has been used as background music for local forecast segments on the Weather Channel in 2012 and 2013.

Discography
 2005: The Dutchman's Gold EP (as The Brokedown)
 2007: I Can't Go On, I'll Go On
 2008: Now or Heaven

Notes

References
 Dye, David. "The Broken West: Indie-pop's new face (and name)", NPR, January 22, 2007.
 Katzif, Michael. "A power-pop gem with a hint of turmoil", NPR, February 2, 2007.
 Dye, David. "The Broken West: catchy hooks, sweet harmonies", NPR, May 2, 2007.
 Deusner, Stephen. Pitchfork record review, Pitchfork Media, February 1, 2007.
 Wenzel, John. "Concerts in review: The Broken West", The Denver Post, May 25, 2007.
 Perler, Elie Z. "Artist of the Day: The Broken West", Spin, January 17, 2007.
 Perry, Jonathan. "Love of LA powers the pop of The Broken West debut", The Boston Globe, March 2, 2007.
 Totale, Todd. "Broken West's Ross Flournoy Interview", Glorious Noise, September 8, 2008.

External links
 The Broken West at Merge Records
 The Broken West Blog at Blogger

Indie rock musical groups from California
Red Rockets Glare artists
Merge Records artists